In My Time is the ninth studio album by Greek keyboardist and composer Yanni, released on the Private Music label in 1993. This album is a gentler collection of piano-focused pieces. The album attained Platinum status and was the second Grammy nomination for Yanni. It peaked at #1 on "Billboard's "Top New Age Albums" chart and at #24 on the "Billboard 200" chart in the same year.

The corresponding concert tour for the year was Yanni Live, The Symphony Concerts 1993.

"This was the kind of album I've been wanting to make for years," Yanni says, "a clear and honest album that would be consistent in its mood. I wanted the audience to feel the human being behind the music. One human being to another. For that reason, I intentionally kept the background instrumentation and production at a minimum."

Album

Critical reception

In a review by Backroads Music/Heartbeats, "Yanni's latest is another extension of his creative spirit and stirring passion for life. Focusing on piano as his primary instrument, Yanni infuses his "signature" style with timeless, eloquent themes and plenty of romantic energy. No longer are rhythm and dynamic currents as vital to his sound, since he seems to have stopped fueling his music with 'rocket power'. His romantic outpourings lend a personal nature to In My Time, and this new effort should be received with enthusiasm far and wide. Yanni is uniquely expressive, and this new music is deeply touching on many levels."

Additional notes
I also wish to thank my band: Osama Afifi (bass), Charlie Bisharat (violin), Karen Briggs (violin), Michael Bruno (percussion), Julie Homi (keyboards), Bradley Joseph (keyboards), Sachi McHenry (cello), and my crew.

Track listing

Personnel
All music composed and produced by Yanni
Endre Granat – violin on "The End of August" and "Felitsa".

Production
Recorded at Yanni's private studios
Engineered by Yanni
Mastered by Chris Bellman at Bernie Grundman Mastering, Los Angeles
Art Direction & Design: Norman Moore
Photography: Lynn Goldsmith

Yanni Live, The Symphony Concerts 1993

Dates
June - September 1993

Cities
30 cities

Set list
"Santorini"
"Until the Last Moment"
"Keys to Imagination"
"In the Mirror"
"The Rain Must Fall"
"Felitsa"
"Within Attraction"
"One Man's Dream"
"Marching Season"
"Nostalgia"
"Acroyali/Standing in Motion (Medley)"
"Aria"
"Reflections of Passion"
"Swept Away"
"Secret Vows"
"The End of August"

The band
Yanni's music follows through on that premise. A typical composition has the sound and form of an instrumental theme for a televised sports event, soap opera or newscast divested of melody and padded out to four or five minutes. Playing a battery of electronic instruments, he and the two other keyboardists in his band (Julie Homi and Bradley Joseph) insert motifs that evoke the hoariest Hollywood cliches of Middle Eastern, Far Eastern and other regional styles. The largely shapeless pieces huff and puff with a galloping energy that suggests an action-movie soundtrack. Although there are meditative moments, the mood is predominantly upbeat, with vigorous rock drums and percussion continually spurring things on and introducing crescendos that go nowhere. Yanni's seven-member band is augmented by a 50-piece orchestra, with the ensemble amplified to a volume that borders on the shrill.

Charlie Adams – drums
Charlie Bisharat – violin
Karen Briggs – violin
Ric Fierabracci – bass guitar
Michael "Kalani" Bruno – percussion
Julie Homi – keyboards
Bradley Joseph – keyboards
Shardad Rohani – Conductor

Tour production
Management/Tour Direction: Vincent Corry
Production Manager: David "Gurn" Kaniski
Yanni's Personal Assistant: Susan Smela
Sound Engineer: Tommy Sterling
Monitor Engineer: Paul Sarault
Monitor Engineer / Technician: Curtis Kelly
Keyboard Tech/Piano Tuner: Peter Maher
Backline Technician: Jeffrer Buswell
Lighting Crew Chief: Gus Thomson
Tour Production Assistant: Danny Hayes & Wade Chandler
Lighting and Stage Design: David Kaniski
Tour Accountant: Diane Kramer, Numbers, Inc.
Yanni's Wardrobe designed by Nolan Miller
Band Wardrobe: Lynn Bugai
Yamaha CFIII Concert Grand Courtesy of the Yamaha Corporation of America, Keyboard Division
Program Design: Norman Moore
Orchestrations and arrangements by Shardad Rohani, John Rinehimer, and Jeffrey Silverman.
Additional orchestration work by Chris Bankey.
Transcriptions and arrangement preparation by Shardad Rohani and Richard Boukas.

Tour dates

Certifications

References

External links
Official Website

In My Time at Discogs
In My Time at Last.fm

Yanni albums
1993 albums
Yanni concert tours